Daphne R. Courtenay-Hicks (born 28 June 1916), better known as Daphne Courtney, is a South African actress, who performed in B-movie British "quota quickies" during the 1930s and 1940s. She had a supporting role in at least one French film, Le battalion du ciel, directed by Alexander Esway. She also had a stage career, and stage credits include the first British performance of The Man Who Came to Dinner (17 Nov 1941) – pre-dating its London debut by three weeks –  in which she appeared with her husband the Scottish actor Hugh McDermott.

Selected filmography
 The Happy Ending (1931)
 A Political Party (1934)
 Father and Son (1934)
 Oh, Daddy! (1935)
 Murder by Rope (1936)
 The Captain's Table (1936)
 Bed and Breakfast (1938)
They Are Not Angels (1947)
Le battalion de ciel (1947)

Stage credits
The Women (The Strand Theatre, 1940)
The Man Who Came to Dinner (Theatre Royal, Birmingham, 1941)
Matinée Idylls (Theatre Royal Haymarket, 1942)
They Also Serve (Theatre Royal, Glasgow, 1944)

See also
British film

References

External links

1916 births
Possibly living people
20th-century South African actresses
British film actresses
British stage actresses
South African film actresses
South African emigrants to the United Kingdom